Ghogi Bariarpur railway station is a railway station on Sahibganj loop line under the Malda railway division of Eastern Railway zone. It is situated beside Jamalpur-Kajra Road at Kalisthan in Lakhisarai district in the Indian state of Bihar.

References

Railway stations in Lakhisarai district
Malda railway division